Fred Freeman (born December 29, 1943) is a former American football player and coach. He was selected by the New York Giants in the 1967 NFL Draft. Freeman served as the head football coach at Hampton University in Hampton, Virginia from 1984 to 1991, compiling a record of 49–31–4.

References

1943 births
Living people
American football tackles
Hampton Pirates football coaches
Mississippi Valley State Delta Devils football players